Vítor Hugo Manique de Jesus (born 3 November 1981), or simply Vítor Hugo, is a Brazilian retired football striker. A journeyman, Vítor Hugo started his professional career in his homeland and also played for numerous clubs in Romania, Peru, Hong Kong, Serbia, Oman, Bahrain and Mexico.

Career
Born in Porto Alegre, Vítor Hugo started his football career with Novo Hamburgo. In September 2003, he moved to Romanian club Altay Constanța, playing in the lower league. In 2004, he spent some time playing with Inter de Lages, before moving abroad again to play with Atlético Universidad of the Peruvian Primera División.

In 2006, Vítor Hugo was playing with Pelotas, but in the middle of the year he joined his fellow Brazilian coach José Ricardo Rambo at Happy Valley in Hong Kong. He also played with Xiangxue Sun Hei during the 2006–07 Hong Kong First Division League.

In 2007, Vítor Hugo returned to Brazil by signing with Veranópolis. He was the top scorer of the Campeonato Gaúcho with 13 goals. He then signed with Sport Recife, making his debut in the Campeonato Brasileiro Série A.

In July 2007, Vítor Hugo joined Serbian side Partizan, but he left the club during the winter break. He then moved to Peruvian club Cienciano, playing with them in the 2008 Copa Libertadores.

Vítor Hugo also appeared in the 2009 Campeonato Brasileiro Série B with América de Natal, previously joining them from Caxias do Sul.

In 2010, after a short spell with Inter de Santa Maria in the Campeonato Gaúcho, Vítor Hugo moved abroad again, this time signing with Omani League side Al Nahda, playing in the 2010 AFC Cup group stage. Afterwards, he moved to play with Manama of the Bahraini Premier League.

Vítor Hugo returned to Brazil once again by joining Guarani de Venâncio Aires for the 2012 season. His next club was Celaya of the Ascenso MX, making two appearances in the 2013 Clausura.

References

External links
 Vítor Hugo at playmakerstats.com (English version of ogol.com.br)

1981 births
Living people
Footballers from Porto Alegre
Brazilian footballers
Association football forwards
Esporte Clube Novo Hamburgo players
Esporte Clube Pelotas players
Sport Club do Recife players
Sociedade Esportiva e Recreativa Caxias do Sul players
América Futebol Clube (RN) players
Campeonato Brasileiro Série A players
Campeonato Brasileiro Série B players
Atlético Universidad footballers
Cienciano footballers
Happy Valley AA players
Sun Hei SC players
Hong Kong First Division League players
FK Partizan players
Serbian SuperLiga players
Al-Nahda Club (Oman) players
Brazilian expatriate footballers
Expatriate footballers in Romania
Brazilian expatriate sportspeople in Romania
Expatriate footballers in Peru
Brazilian expatriate sportspeople in Peru
Expatriate footballers in Hong Kong
Brazilian expatriate sportspeople in Hong Kong
Expatriate footballers in Serbia
Brazilian expatriate sportspeople in Serbia
Expatriate footballers in Oman
Brazilian expatriate sportspeople in Oman
Expatriate footballers in Bahrain
Expatriate footballers in Mexico
Brazilian expatriate sportspeople in Mexico
Esporte Clube Internacional de Lages players